Pachydactylus capensis, also known as Cape gecko or Cape thick-toed gecko, is a species of lizard in the family Gekkonidae. It is found in southern Africa.

References

Pachydactylus
Reptiles described in 1846